The 1966 NCAA University Division Swimming and Diving Championships were contested in March 1966 at the Cadet Gymnasium at the United States Air Force Academy in Colorado Springs, Colorado at the 43rd annual NCAA-sanctioned swim meet to determine the team and individual national champions of University Division men's collegiate swimming and diving in the United States.

USC topped the team standings for the fourth consecutive year, once again finishing ahead of Indiana. This was the Trojans' fifth title in program history (and fifth title in six years).

Team standings
Note: Top 10 only
(H) = Hosts
Full results

See also
List of college swimming and diving teams

References

NCAA Division I Men's Swimming and Diving Championships
NCAA University Division Swimming And Diving Championships
NCAA University Division Swimming And Diving Championships
NCAA University Division Swimming And Diving Championships